Climbing locations in India, there is equal distribution of rock climbing destinations in India. The availability of  good climbing locations are not too far from the city. They allow both amateurs and professionals to go rock climbing and have become popular among tourists. Given below are the names of some of the major destinations for rock climbing in India to give one a better idea of the places where they can engage in this game.

Southern India

Badami, a five-hour drive from Bangalore, has many places to go rock climbing. Bangalore is in the center of a number of rock-climbing destinations like Ramanagara (the setting for the Hindi blockbuster Sholay), Ramadevara betta, Savandurga, madhugiri, Thenginkalbetta, Kabbal, SRS betta, and others.

Eastern India

In a  radius adjoining Calcutta, there are many rock-climbing destinations like Purulia, Matha Bura, Jai Chandi, and Susunia Hills. The Himalayan Mountaineering Institute provides some courses in Mountaineering at Gobu and Tenzing Norgay Rocks.

Western India

There are several  rock-climbing destinations near Mumbai like Kanheri Caves in the Borivili National Park, Mumbra Boulders, CBD Belapur and Manori Rocks. In Gujarat, Pavagadh is a tourist favorite rock-climbing destination as well as Idar and Junagadh. Pandit Dindayal Upadhyay Training Center at Junagadh, Gujarat also organizes Basic Course in Rock Climbing. In Rajasthan, the region around Mount Abu like State Mountaineering Institute's training area, Golden Horn Spire, and Adhar Devi Slabs are popular rock-climbing destinations. In Madhya Pradesh, Bheembhetka just  from Bhopal and Panchmadi are popular climbing spots.

Northern India

North India offers some of the best and toughest challenges in rock climbing both for amateurs as well as for professionals. The might of Himalayan rocks have always been the inspiration for many professional climbers. New Delhi and the region around it provide some very good options in rock-climbing arena. In Himachal Pradesh, Manali, Sethan, Solang Nala, Chattru, Chota Dhara, Dharamshala. In J&K there are some quality granite for climbing in Leh - Ladakh, Shey, Gangles, Lankershey (near Kargil) and the adjoining region provide some of the toughest and most exciting rock climbing options in the world. Professional climbers from all over the world come here to negotiate the rocks and to find new challenges.

Besides these, there are many artificial climbing walls in Delhi, Calcutta, Mumbai, Bangalore, Darjeeling, Manali, Leh, Uttarkashi, Bikaner, and at Mathura Road near Badarpur border in Haryana.

Karnataka 
 Bangalore
 Antharagange
 Badami
 Chamundi Betta
 Kunti betta
 Hampi
 Madhugiri
 Narsapur Rocks
 Ramanagaram
 Raogodlu
 Savan Durga
 Turahalli
 Kabbal Durga
 Malekal Tirupathi
 Chikkaballapura

Kerala 
 Chembra Peak
 Pythal Mala
 Ranipuram

Maharashtra 
Pune
Nashik
Mumbai

Gujarat 
 Ahmadabad- Police Headquarters Shahibag 
 Surat- Fountainhead School
 Idar
Junagadh
Pavagadh

Rajasthan 
 Mount Abu

Uttar Pradesh 
 Kanpur- Climbing wall at IIT Kanpur

Adventure tourism in India